In sewing and dressmaking, a ruffle, frill, or furbelow is a strip of fabric, lace or ribbon tightly gathered or pleated on one edge and applied to a garment, bedding, or other textile as a form of trimming.

Ruffles can be made from a single layer of fabric (which may need a hem) or a doubled layer. Plain ruffles are usually cut on the straight grain.

Ruffles may be gathered by using a gathering stitch, or by passing the fabric through a mechanical ruffler, which is an attachment available for some sewing machines.

A flounce is a particular type of fabric manipulation that creates a similar look but with less bulk. The term derives from earlier terms of frounce or fronce. A wavy effect is achieved without gathers or pleats by cutting a curved (or even circular) strip of fabric and applying the inner or shorter edge to the garment. The depth of the curve as well as the width of the fabric determines the depth of the flounce. A godet is a circle wedge that can be inserted into a flounce to further deepen the outer floating wave without adding additional bulk at the point of attachment to the body of the garment, such as at the hemline, collar or sleeve.

Ruffles appeared at the draw-string necklines of full chemises in the 15th century and evolved into the separately-constructed ruff of the 16th century. Ruffles and flounces remained a fashionable form of trim, off-and-on, into modern times.

See also 

 Nun's veiling, a lightweight sheer woolen cloth, was used in flounce in the 19th century.

Notes

References
 Arnold, Janet: Patterns of Fashion: the cut and construction of clothes for men and women 1560–1620, Macmillan 1985. Revised edition 1986.
 Baumgarten, Linda: What Clothes Reveal: The Language of Clothing in Colonial and Federal America, Yale University Press, 2002.  
 Oxford English Dictionary
 Picken, Mary Brooks: The Fashion Dictionary, Funk and Wagnalls, 1957. (1973 edition )
 Tozer, Jane and Sarah Levitt, Fabric of Society: A Century of People and their Clothes 1770–1870, Laura Ashley Press, 
 Smith, Alison: The Sewing Book, Dorling Kindersley Press,

External links
 

15th-century fashion
16th-century fashion
Fashion design
Parts of clothing
Sewing